Potassium channel, subfamily K, member 12, also known as KCNK12 is a human gene.  The protein encoded by this gene, K2P12.1, is a potassium channel containing two pore-forming P domains.

See also
 Tandem pore domain potassium channel

References

Further reading

External links 
 

Ion channels